Kelsey's Essentials is an American cooking television series that aired on Cooking Channel. It was presented by chef Kelsey Nixon, who came to prominence as a contestant on the fourth season of the Food Network series Food Network Star. The series featured Nixon teaching viewers how to cook and follow recipes "with confidence" and by utilizing "essential" kitchen utensils.

Kelsey's Essentials premiered on November 6, 2010 and concluded on December 14, 2016, after six seasons.

Episodes

References

External links
 
 
 Rock Shrimp Productions  The Full-Service Production Team

2010 American television series debuts
2010s American cooking television series
2016 American television series endings
Cooking Channel original programming
English-language television shows
Food reality television series
Television series by Rock Shrimp Productions